MV Mercury may refer to:

, a coaster
, a cruise ship

Ship names